A Month in the Country is the fifth novel by J. L. Carr, first published in 1980 and nominated for the Booker Prize. The book won the Guardian Fiction Prize in 1980.

Plot
The plot concerns Tom Birkin, a World War I veteran employed to uncover a mural in a village church that was thought to exist under coats of whitewash. At the same time another veteran is employed to look for a grave beyond the churchyard walls. Though Birkin is an unbeliever, there is prevalent religious symbolism throughout the book, mainly dealing with judgement. The novel explores themes of England's loss of spirituality after the war, and of happiness, melancholy, and nostalgia as Birkin recalls the summer uncovering the mural, when he healed from his wartime experiences and a broken marriage.

Critical reception 
In an essay for Open Letters Monthly, Ingrid Norton praised the novel's subtlety:
The happiness depicted in A Month in the Country is wise and wary, aware of its temporality. When he arrives in Oxgodby, Birkin knows very well life is not all ease and intimacy, long summer days with "winter always loitering around the corner." He has experienced emotional cruelty in his failed marriage. As a soldier, he witnessed death: destruction and unending mud.

But the edges are brighter for it. Birkin's idyll in the country is brought into relief by what Birkin has gone through in the past and the disappointments that, it is implied, await him. Carr's great art is to make it clear that joy is inseparable from the pain and oblivion which unmake it.

Background 
Many of the incidents in the novel are based on real events in Carr's own life, and some of the characters are modelled on his own Methodist family.

The jacket illustration shows Tintagel Parish Church in Cornwall, though the story is set in Yorkshire. The grave outside the churchyard wall was suggested by Tintagel where a number of early graves were encountered at Trecarne Lands and excavated.

The text finishes with the words, "Stocken, Presteigne, 1978". Although the book is set in North Yorkshire, Carr wrote early drafts while staying in his caravan in the top orchard at Stocken Farm, just outside Presteigne in Powys, Wales.

The novel is a set book as a part of some secondary school English courses.

Dramatisation

With a screenplay by Simon Gray, the novel was made into a 1987 film, directed by Pat O'Connor and starring Colin Firth, Kenneth Branagh, Natasha Richardson and Patrick Malahide.  Shortly before his death, Dave Sheasby completed a radio adaptation of the book, which was first broadcast on the BBC Radio 4 Saturday Play in November 2010 and repeated in May 2012.

References

External links
 
 Stanford's Another Look book club reborn with J. L. Carr's A Month in the Country
 Entry on novel in Bibliography of J.L. Carr

1980 British novels
English novels
Novels by J. L. Carr
Novels set in Yorkshire
Fiction set in 1920
British novels adapted into films